Elena Nikolaevna Tretyakova (born 23 December 1988, Legnica, Poland) is a Russian singer, bassist, and a former member of the Russian girls pop-rock group Ranetki (in 2005 to 2013).

Since February 2012 to November 2015 a solo singer. From November 2015 she soloist of the Sea Band.

Tretyakova graduated from Moscow State Art and Cultural University. In the spring of 2021, she made coming out as a bisexual, stating that she had relationships with girls.  She is fond of and teaches kundalini yoga.

Сareer

Studio albums 
The group Ranetki:
 Ranetki (2006)
 Our Time Has Come (2009)
 Do Not Ever Forget (2010)
 Bring Back the Rock-n-roll (2011)
Solo albums:
 Point B  (2014)
 The Dozen (2015)

Filmography 
2008–2009 Ranetki (TV series) as Elena Kulemina
2009–2010 Ranetki Live – Revelation teens
2010 Once in Babene-Babene (TV)
2010 Winx Club: The Secret of the Lost Kingdom as Layla (Russian voice)
 2016 Alexander Peresvet – Kulikovo Echo   as Anya
 2017 Detained (short)   as Extra
 2019 Lethalz (short)   as Young Lindsay

References

External links

 Официальный сайт Лены Третьяковой

1988 births
Living people
People from Legnica
Russian rock singers
Russian pop singers
Singers from Moscow
Russian actresses
Russian voice actresses
Russian television actresses
21st-century Russian singers
21st-century Russian women singers
Russian LGBT singers
Russian bass guitarists